Bruni is an Italian surname. Notable people with the surname include:

Amedeo Bruni (1906-1991), Italian sports shooter
Antonio Bruni (merchant) (died 1598), Albanian merchant
Antoine Bruni d'Entrecasteaux (1737-1793), French naval officer, explorer and colonial governor
Antonio Bartolomeo Bruni (1757–1821), Italian violist, composer and conductor
Bruno Bruni (artist) (born 1935), Italian artist
Bruno Bruni (athlete) (born 1955), Italian high jumper
Carla Bruni (born 1967), Italian-French model, singer and third wife of Nicolas Sarkozy, former President of France
Celestino Bruni O.S.A. (XVII century), Bishop of Boiano
Dino Bruni (born 1932), Italian road cyclist
Domenico Bruni (1600-1666), Italian painter of the Baroque period, mainly active in Brescia
Emily Bruni (born 1975), English actress
Ferruccio Bruni (1899-1971), Italian middle-distance runner 
Fyodor Bruni (1799–1875), Russian painter of Italian origin
Francesco Bruni (disambiguation), several people
Frank Bruni (born 1964), American journalist and long-time writer for The New York Times
Georgina Bruni (1947–2008), British ufologist
Geronimo Bruni (XVII century), Italian painter, pupil of Jacques Courtois
Gian Giacomo Bruni (died 1507), Bishop of Nepi e Sutri 
Gianmaria Bruni (born 1981), Italian racing driver
Giovanni Bruni (1500-1531), Albanian Bishop of Bar from Ulcinj 
Giovanni Bruni, designer of the Bruni 3V-1 Eolo glider
Gustavo Maria Bruni (1903-1911), Italian boy under canonization by the Roman Catholic Church
Leonardo Bruni (c. 1370–1444), humanist, historian and chancellor of Florence
Loïc Bruni (born 1994), professional downhill mountain biker
Louis H. Bruni (born 1949), Texas politician
Ludovic Bruni (born 1976), French guitarist, bassist and music producer
Massimo Bruni Corvino (d. 1522), Roman Catholic Bishop of Isernia 
Orazio Bruni (born c. 1630), Italian engraver 
Paolo Emilio Bruni (died 1506), Bishop of Nepi e Sutri (1507–1516)
Rachele Bruni (born 1990), Italian swimmer
Romulo Bruni (1871-1939), Italian cyclist
Roberta Bruni (born 1964), Italian pole vaulter
Rodrigo Bruni (born 1993), Argentine rugby union player of the national Argentina team 
Sergio Bruni (1921-2003), Italian singer, guitarist, and songwriter
Teofilo Bruni (1569-1638), Italian mathematician and astronomer
Valeria Bruni Tedeschi (born 1964), Italian-French actress and sister of Carla Bruni
Virgile Bruni (born 1989), French rugby union player

Others 
Bruni Löbel (1920-2006), German stage, film and television actress

Italian-language surnames